Microbacterium panaciterrae is a Gram-positive, aerobic and non-motile bacterium from the genus Microbacterium which has been isolated from the rhizosphere of a ginseng plant in the Chungnam Province in Korea.

References

External links
Type strain of Microbacterium panaciterrae at BacDive -  the Bacterial Diversity Metadatabase	

Bacteria described in 2015
panaciterrae